Events from the year 1976 in Ireland.

Incumbents
 President:
 Cearbhall Ó Dálaigh (until 22 October 1976)
 Patrick Hillery (from 3 December 1976)
 Taoiseach: Liam Cosgrave (FG)
 Tánaiste: Brendan Corish (Lab)
 Minister for Finance: Richie Ryan (FG)
 Chief Justice: Tom O'Higgins
 Dáil: 20th
 Seanad: 13th

Events
 5 January –
 Former Taoiseach, John A. Costello, died in Dublin aged 84.
 Kingsmill massacre: Ten Protestant workmen were killed in County Armagh, Northern Ireland, by members of the South Armagh Republican Action Force, after loyalists shot dead six Catholic civilians in South Armagh the previous day.
 1 March – Merlyn Rees, Secretary of State for Northern Ireland in the Government of the United Kingdom, ended Special Category Status for those sentenced for crimes relating to civil violence in Northern Ireland.
 4 March – The Northern Ireland Constitutional Convention was formally dissolved, resulting in direct rule of Northern Ireland by the Government of the United Kingdom in London.
 18 March – Taoiseach Liam Cosgrave and Mrs. Cosgrave were greeted by President Gerald Ford and Mrs. Betty Ford at the White House in Washington DC.
 31 March – Sallins Train Robbery: A large quantity of money was stolen from a CIÉ train at Sallins, County Kildare.
 3 April – The last passenger train ran on the Limerick–Claremorris line ending an 80-year north–south link along the western seaboard.
 17 May – Tim Severin in the boat Brendan set off from Dingle to America, tracing the route of the legendary 6th-century Irish monk, Brendan the Navigator.
 29 June – The highest temperature record in Ireland this century, 32.5 °C (90.5 °F) at Boora, County Offaly. The highest on record was in 1887.
 July – The rock band Horslips gave a rooftop performance from Bank of Ireland headquarters on Baggot Street in Dublin.
 15 July – Four prisoners escaped when bombs exploded in the Special Criminal Court in Dublin.
 21 July – Christopher Ewart-Biggs, UK ambassador, and a civil servant, Judith Cooke, were killed by a landmine at Sandyford, County Dublin.
 1 September – The state of emergency in the Republic, which was legally in force since 1939, was lifted.
 23 September – The President, Cearbhall Ó Dálaigh, consulted with the Council of State for four hours on whether to refer the Emergency Powers legislation to the Supreme Court.
 22 October – President Cearbhall Ó Dálaigh resigned following the 'thundering disgrace' remark from the Minister for Defence, Paddy Donegan.
 27 October – A new £5 note was introduced bearing an image of the 9th-century philosopher, Johannes Scotus Eriugena.
 20 November – National Peace Day was marked with marches, church services, and bell ringing.
 3 December – Patrick Hillery was inaugurated as the sixth President of Ireland in St. Patrick's Hall, Dublin Castle.
 10 December – Betty Williams and Mairead Corrigan won the Nobel Peace Prize.
 The Islamic Foundation of Ireland established the first mosque in Ireland, in Dublin.

Arts and literature
 25 September – The band U2 was formed at Mount Temple Comprehensive School, Dublin.
 9 December – Maeve Binchy's play End of Term premièred on the Abbey Theatre's Peacock Stage.
 The Rooney Prize for Irish Literature was launched; Heno Magee was the first recipient.
 John Banville's novel Doctor Copernicus was published.
 Breandán Ó hEithir's novel Lig Sinn i gCathú was published and became the first Irish language book to top Ireland's hardback bestseller list.
 The monthly journal Books Ireland was founded.

Sport

Golf
Carroll's Irish Open was won by Ben Crenshaw (USA).

Births
10 January – Jason Sherlock, Dublin Gaelic footballer.
6 February – Darragh Maguire, soccer player.
10 February – Tony McDonnell, soccer player.
12 February – Mundy, singer-songwriter.
13 February – Denis Hickie, rugby player.
17 March – Stephen Gately, singer and actor.
20 April – Shay Given, international soccer player.
24 April – Steve Finnan, soccer player, former international.
15 May – Mark Kennedy, soccer player.
25 May – Cillian Murphy, actor.
31 May – Colin Farrell, actor.
2 June – Dáithí Ó Sé, television host.
3 June – Enda Markey, Irish-Australian actor and producer
12 June – Tony Scully, soccer player.
15 June – Gary Lightbody, Snow Patrol singer.
29 June – Duncan O'Mahony, Canadian football punter and placekicker.
3 July – Shane Lynch, singer and actor.
8 July – David Wallace, rugby player.
9 July – Ollie Canning, Galway hurler.
14 July – Kirsten Sheridan, film director and screenwriter.
23 July – Brian Carney, rugby player.
11 August – Claire Byrne, journalist and television presenter.
18 August – Robbie Murray, boxer.
29 August- Joseph Armstrong, boxer.
16 September – Liz Bonnin, television presenter
18 September - Adam Mates, singer (OTT)
4 October – Owen Heary, soccer player.
15 October – Paul Mooney, cricketer.
19 October – Alan Quirke, Cork Gaelic footballer.
20 October – John Leonard, Dublin Gaelic footballer.
21 October – Andrew Scott, actor

Full date unknown
Paddy Christie, Dublin Gaelic footballer.
Kevin Flynn, Dublin hurler.
Donal Ryan, novelist.

Deaths
5 January – John A. Costello, barrister, Attorney General, Fine Gael TD and twice Taoiseach (born 1891).
19 January – John Hunt, antiquarian (born 1900 in England).
23 January – David Sullivan, labour leader in USA (born 1904).
2 February – Gardner Budd, lawyer.
6 February – Dan Kennedy, Kilkenny hurler (born 1926).
12 February – Frank Stagg, Provisional Irish Republican Army hunger striker for 62 days in Wakefield Prison (born 1942).
28 February – Pat Hone, cricketer (born 1886).
29 February – Liam Cunningham, Fianna Fáil TD (born 1915).
8 March – Edward FitzGerald, 7th Duke of Leinster, peer and gambler (born 1892).
13 April
Willie Hough, Limerick hurler (born 1892).
Noel Lemass, Fianna Fáil TD (born 1929).
4 May – Hugh Delargy, British Labour Party politician and MP (born 1908).
27 June – Derrick Kennedy, cricketer (born 1904).
11 July – Michael Hayes, pro-treaty TD, Cabinet Minister, Ceann Comhairle of Dáil Éireann and Seanad Éireann member (born 1889).
22 July – Jim Ganly, cricketer and rugby player (born 1904).
29 July – Knox Cunningham, barrister, businessman and Ulster Unionist politician (born 1909).
12 September – Reginald Lyons, cricketer (born 1922).
7 October – Michael O'Neill, nationalist politician and MP (born 1909).
15 October – James Ennis, cricketer (born 1900).
31 October – Eileen Gray, architect and designer (born 1878).
2 November – Walter Starkie, author and translator (born 1894).
14 November – Frederick Alfred Pile, soldier and politician (born 1884).
4 December – W. F. McCoy, Ulster Unionist member of the Parliament of Northern Ireland (born 1886).

See also
1976 in Irish television

References

External links

 
1970s in Ireland
Ireland
Years of the 20th century in Ireland